Raluca Elena Babaligea (born 5 April 1984 in Bucharest, Romania) is a Romanian aerobic gymnast. She won two world championship medals (one silver and one bronze) and two European championships medals (one gold and one bronze).

References

External links

1984 births
Living people
Gymnasts from Bucharest
Romanian aerobic gymnasts
Female aerobic gymnasts
Medalists at the Aerobic Gymnastics World Championships
21st-century Romanian women